Remigiusz Sobociński (born 11 March 1974) is a Polish professional footballer who plays for Ossa Biskupiec Pomorski.

Career

In 1997, Sobociński signed for top-flight Amica Wronki from Jeziorak Iława in the lower leagues. During his seven-season stay with the club, he helped them win the Polish Cup three times in a row, finish third on two occasions and compete in the UEFA Cup, where they played against Atletico Madrid.

In 4–0 win over GKS Katowice, he recorded four assists.

In the second half of 2004/05, Sobociński chose to go on loan to Kujawiak Włocławek in the second league after lack of sleep due to his child affected his form. After that, he received an offer from German club Nuremberg but did not accept it because he was afraid of the language barrier.

As of 2021, Sobociński plays for Ossa Biskupiec Pomorski in the Polish amateur leagues.

References

External links
 Remigiusz Sobociński at 90minut

Polish footballers
Living people
1974 births
Association football forwards
People from Iława
Jeziorak Iława players
Amica Wronki players
Kujawiak Włocławek players
Jagiellonia Białystok players
Śląsk Wrocław players
Ekstraklasa players
I liga players
II liga players
III liga players
IV liga players